HD 21389 is a supergiant variable star in reflection nebula VdB 15, in the constellation Camelopardalis. It has the variable star designation CE Camelopardalis, abbreviated CE Cam. This object is part of the Camelopardalis OB1 association. The near-identical member CS Camelopardalis lies half a degree to the north.

Since 1943, the spectrum of CE Cam has served as one of the stable anchor points by which other stars are classified.

CE Camelopardalis is some 19 times as massive as the Sun and 55,000 timers as luminous.  Hohle and colleagues, using the parallax, extinction and analysis of spectrum, came up with a mass 14.95 ± 0.41 times that and luminosity 62,679 times that of the Sun.

CE Cam is embedded in a large dusty molecular cloud, part of which it illuminates as a reflection nebula (vdB15 or BFS 29).  This is a region of ongoing star formation with stars aged from one to a hundred million years old.  CE Cam itself is thought to be around 11 million years old, long enough to have exhausted its core hydrogen and evolved away from the main sequence into a supergiant.

References

External links
 Image CE Camelopardalis
 Starry Van Den Bergh 14 and 15

Camelopardalis (constellation)
Alpha Cygni variables
021389
016281
A-type supergiants
Camelopardalis, CE
1040
Durchmusterung objects